Stuart Neame was a rugby union international who represented England from 1879 to 1880.

Early life
Stuart Neame was born on 15 June 1856 in Preston-next-Faversham, the son of Frederick Neame and Mary Tassell. He attended Cheltenham College.

Rugby union career
Neame made his international debut for England on 10 March 1879 in the match against Scotland match at Edinburgh.
Of the four matches he played for his national side the team won three times, and drew once.
He played his final match for England on 28 February 1880 against Scotland at Whalley Range, Manchester.

References

1856 births
1936 deaths
English rugby union players
England international rugby union players
Rugby union forwards
People educated at Cheltenham College
Rugby union players from Kent